John Henry Yurchey (November 12, 1917 – June 1, 1994) was an American football quarterback, halfback, and defensive back who played one game in the National Football League (NFL) for the Pittsburgh Steelers. He played college football for Duquesne.

Yurchey was born on November 12, 1917, in Bridgeville, Pennsylvania. He attended Bridgeville High School there before playing college football at Duquesne University. He saw significant playing time starting as a sophomore, playing the quarterback position. As a senior, he helped the team achieve an undefeated 8–0–1 record, including an upset victory over number one ranked Pittsburgh.

Though Yurchey went unselected in the 1940 NFL Draft, he was signed by the Pittsburgh Steelers, and appeared in one regular season game. He wore number 11, and played halfback and defensive back. He also made three punts for 121 yards, with two going for 40 yards and one for 41. It would be his only career game.

After his brief stint in professional football, Yurchey served as an air traffic controller during World War II, and was a postal clerk at the Bridgeville Post Office for 15 years. He died on June 1, 1994, in Bridgeville, from a heart attack.

References

1917 births
1994 deaths
Players of American football from Pennsylvania
American football quarterbacks
American football running backs
American football defensive backs
Duquesne Dukes football players
People from Bridgeville, Pennsylvania
Pittsburgh Steelers players